Apollo (System Copernicus) is a stained glass window, designed by Stanisław Wyspiański for the Medical Society in Krakow, from 1904.

Location and history 
The stained glass is located in the Medical Society house in Krakow, which was built for Dr. Julian Nowak in 1904. This is only one of the many art elements of the building designed by Wyspiański; he also designed stair railings, wall paintings and flooring, as well as furniture and chandeliers. The Wyspiański stained glass windows in the House of Medicine are the only stained glass windows by the artist housed in a secular building.

The stained glass is based on a pastel by Wyspiański with the same title; the pastel drawing is located in the collection of the National Museum in Krakow, which received it in 1946 as a gift from Dr. Nowak. This stained glass is one of the most reproduced works by Wyspiański, and has been printed in magazines, albums and postage stamps.

Description 
Apollo, god of the Sun, is represented tied up and attached to a lyre, which is crushing him with its weight. Such an approach to the subject has been interpreted among other things, as a reference to Nicolaus Copernicus stopping the Sun. Around Apollo, the painting shows other objects of the Solar System: Saturn, Jupiter, Mars, Mercury, Earth, Luna, and Venus.

See also 
God the father - Arise

References  

1904 in art
Stained glass windows
Works by Stanisław Wyspiański
Nicolaus Copernicus
Apollo in art